Frank Nuki Ken Shelford (born 16 May 1955) is a former New Zealand rugby union player. A flanker, Shelford represented Bay of Plenty and Hawkes Bay at provincial level, and was a member of the New Zealand national side, the All Blacks, from 1981 to 1985. He played 22 matches for the All Blacks including four internationals.

Of Whakatōhea descent, Shelford played for New Zealand Māori, captaining the side against Tonga in 1983. He won the Tom French Cup for Māori player of the year in 1981.

Shelford was named the supreme winner at the 1984 Bay of Plenty sports awards.

References

1955 births
Living people
Bay of Plenty rugby union players
Māori All Blacks players
New Zealand international rugby union players
New Zealand rugby union players
People educated at Opotiki College
Rugby union flankers
Rugby union players from Ōpōtiki
Whakatōhea people